Cellobiose is a disaccharide with the formula (C6H7(OH)4O)2O. It is classified as a reducing sugar.  In terms of its chemical structure, it is derived from the condensation of a pair of β-glucose molecules forming a β(1→4) bond. It can be hydrolyzed to glucose enzymatically or with acid. Cellobiose has eight free alcohol (OH) groups, one acetal linkage and one hemiacetal linkage, which give rise to strong inter- and intramolecular hydrogen bonds. It is a white solid.

It can be obtained by enzymatic or acidic hydrolysis of cellulose and cellulose-rich materials such as cotton, jute, or paper. Cellobiose can be used as an indicator carbohydrate for Crohn's disease and malabsorption syndrome.

Treatment of cellulose with acetic anhydride and sulfuric acid gives cellobiose octoacetate, which is no longer a hydrogen bond donor (though it is still a hydrogen bond acceptor) and is soluble in nonpolar organic solvents.

References

Disaccharides
Glycerols